The Southern Presbyterian Church is a small denomination with a community of about 130 persons located exclusively in Tasmania, Australia. It formed in 1986 when two ministers (one of whom died a few months later) and a number of members left the Evangelical Presbyterian Church because of a difference of belief over doctrinal issues.

As of 2021, the Southern Presbyterian Church had two congregations: one in Glenorchy and one in Launceston. Public worship is conducted with Scripture reading, preaching, prayer, and the unaccompanied singing of Psalms. The Southern Presbyterian Church uses the King James Version of the Bible in public worship. Its supreme standard is the Bible according to the Received Text, but they, according to Ward and Humphreys, "in other respects are close to the PCEA in orientation" with whom it is exploring closer relations.

Reconciliation with Evangelical Presbyterian Church 
In March 2019, a joint meeting with officer bearers of the EPC and the SPC sought to repair damaged relations between the two denominations due to the historic split from decades before. The statement said in part:

We  of  the  EPCA  and  SPCA,  as  we  consider  our  two histories as churches, acknowledge  before  the  Lord Jesus,  the  Head  of  the  Church,  that  while  there  were honourable principles and legitimate concerns involved, and while there was a desire on both sides for the good of Christ Jesus’ cause, there was also sin committed by all  those  involved  in  the  events  which  led  to  a separation and alienation of brethren a generation ago.Together  we  acknowledge  that  those  sad  events  of yesteryear have harmed the name and cause of Christ Jesus and  have  hurt  and  caused  to  stumble  various  of  His children.
...

We  therefore,  in  the  spirit  of  Christian  and  brotherly love,  jointly  publish  this  statement,  and  extend  the  right hand of fellowship to one another, seeking to offer mutual respect and care, and to work together as able, to honour and  uphold  Christ  in  our  two  churches  and  our  future relationship

See also
List of Presbyterian and Reformed denominations in Australia

References

External links
Southern Presbyterian Church Website

Christian organizations established in 1986
Presbyterian denominations in Australia
Presbyterian denominations established in the 20th century
1986 establishments in Australia